Gobius is a genus of fish in the family Gobiidae native to fresh, brackish and marine waters of and around Europe, Africa and Asia. It contains the typical gobies, being the type genus of the formerly recognised subfamily Gobiinae and family and the namesake genus of its order Gobiiformes.

Species
There are currently 28 recognized species in this genus:

 Gobius ater Bellotti, 1888 (Bellotti's goby)
 Gobius ateriformis Brito & P. J. Miller, 2001
 Gobius auratus A. Risso, 1810 (Golden goby)
 Gobius boekeri Ahl, 1931
 Gobius bucchichi Steindachner, 1870 (Bucchich's goby)
 Gobius cobitis Pallas, 1814 (Giant goby)
 Gobius couchi P. J. Miller & El-Tawil, 1974 (Couch's goby)
 Gobius cruentatus J. F. Gmelin, 1789 (Red-mouthed goby)
 Gobius fallax Sarato, 1889 (Sarato's goby)
 Gobius gasteveni P. J. Miller, 1974 (Steven's goby)
 Gobius geniporus Valenciennes, 1837 (Slender goby)
 Gobius hypselosoma Bleeker, 1867
 Gobius incognitus Kovačić & Šanda, 2016
 Gobius kolombatovici Kovačić & P. J. Miller, 2000
 Gobius koseirensis Klunzinger, 1871
 Gobius leucomelas W. K. H. Peters, 1868
 Gobius niger Linnaeus, 1758 (Black goby)
 Gobius paganellus Linnaeus, 1758 (Rock goby)
 Gobius roulei F. de Buen, 1928 (Roule's goby)
 Gobius rubropunctatus Delais, 1951
 Gobius salamansa Iglésias & Frotté, 2015 (Salamansa goby)
 Gobius scorteccii Poll, 1961
 Gobius senegambiensis Metzelaar, 1919
 Gobius strictus Fage, 1907 (Schmidt's goby)
 Gobius tetrophthalmus Brito & P. J. Miller, 2001
 Gobius tropicus Osbeck, 1765
 Gobius vittatus Vinciguerra, 1883 (Striped goby)
 Gobius xanthocephalus Heymer & Zander, 1992 (Yellow-headed goby)

References

 
Gobiinae
Taxa named by Carl Linnaeus
Marine fish genera
Taxonomy articles created by Polbot